During World War II, also called shimbu-tai, were specialized units of the Imperial Japanese Navy and Imperial Japanese Army normally used for suicide missions. They included kamikaze aircraft, fukuryu frogmen, and several types of suicide boats and submarines.

Background 
Towards the end of the Pacific War, the Japanese were increasingly anticipating an American attack into the country and preparation was made for its defense. This was called Ketsu Go and the operation included the formation of specialized Japanese units. The move was driven by the realization that, in order to defend their homeland, conventional warfare was no longer sufficient. The recruitment of soldiers willing to die in the suicide missions was, therefore, easily carried out. The suicide attack is also an accepted method of fighting and this is largely attributed to Japan's highly militaristic society as demonstrated by the samurai system with its bushido code, which established a legacy that honors and idealizes self-sacrifice.   

Japan saw the efficacy of the specialized units during their deployment in the Philippines in summer-fall 1944 when special attack units executed their first missions. Japan saw that they were able to achieve results with limited resources. Historians view the success of the suicide tactics as an important driver to Japanese war policies after 1943.

Aircraft

Ohka suicide rocket aircraft

The Yokosuka MXY-7  was a purpose-built kamikaze aircraft employed by the Imperial Japanese Navy Air Service towards the end of World War II. The US gave the aircraft the Japanese name Baka ("idiot").

It was a small flying bomb that was carried underneath a Mitsubishi G4M2e "Betty", Yokosuka P1Y Ginga "Frances" (guided Type 22) or planned Heavy Nakajima G8N Renzan "Rita" (transport type 33) bomber to within range of its target; on release, the pilot would first glide towards the target and when close enough he would fire the Ohkas engine(s) and dive onto the ship to destroy it. That final approach was almost unstoppable (especially for Type 11) because the aircraft gained tremendous speed. Later versions were designed to be launched from coastal air bases and caves, and even from submarines equipped with aircraft catapults, although none were actually used this way.

Shinryu
The Mizuno  was a proposed rocket-powered kamikaze aircraft designed for the Imperial Japanese Navy towards the end of World War II. It never reached production.

Tsurugi
The Nakajima Ki-115  was a one-man kamikaze aircraft developed by the Imperial Japanese Army Air Force in the closing stages of World War II in late 1945.

Baika
The  was a pulsejet-powered kamikaze aircraft under development for the Imperial Japanese Navy towards the end of World War II. The war ended before any were built. The design was inspired by the manned version of the German V1 flying bomb, the Fieseler Fi 103R "Reichenberg".

Boats

Shinyo and Maru-Ni
The  were Japanese suicide boats developed during World War II. They were part of the wider Special Attack Units program. The Maru-Ni was an Army version with two depth charges the operator would drop and try to escape before detonation.

Around 6,200 Shinyo were produced for the Imperial Japanese Navy and 3,000 Maru-Ni for the Imperial Japanese Army. Around 400 were deployed to Okinawa and Formosa, and the rest were stored on the coast of Japan for the ultimate defense against the invasion of the Home islands.

Submarines

Kaiten

The  was a torpedo modified as a suicide weapon, and used by the Imperial Japanese Navy in the final stages of World War II.

Early designs allowed for the pilot to escape after the final acceleration towards the target, although whether this could have been done successfully is doubtful. There is no record of any pilot attempting to escape or intending to do so, and this provision was dropped from later production kaitens.  The inventor of the Kaiten, Lt. Hiroshi Kuroki was lost during one of the first training missions. When the sub was raised, a note written during his final minutes before death was found, sending his respects to his family and detailing the cause of the accident and how to repair the defect.

Kairyu

The  was a class of Suicide midget submarines of the Imperial Japanese Navy, designed in 1943–1944, and produced from the beginning of 1945. These submarines were designed to meet the invading American Naval forces upon their anticipated approach of Tokyo.

These submarines had a two-man crew and were armed with two torpedoes and an internal warhead for suicide missions. Over 760 of these submarines were planned, and by August 1945, 200 had been manufactured, most of them at the Yokosuka shipyard.

Divers

 were a part of the Special Attack Units prepared to resist the invasion of the Home islands by Allied forces. They were armed with a mine containing  of explosive, fitted to a  bamboo pole. They would dive and stick the pole into the hull of an enemy ship, destroying themselves in the process. They were equipped with a diving jacket and trousers, diving shoes, and a diving helmet fixed by four bolts. 
Several deaths occurred during training due to malfunctions, but this weapon is only known to have been used a few times operationally:
January 8, 1945: Damage by suicide divers to Infantry landing craft (gunboat) LCI(G)-404 in Yoo Passage, Palaus. 
February 10, 1945: Attempted attack by suicide divers on surveying ship  in Schonian Harbor, Palaus.

See also
 Banzai charge
 Chiran Special Attack Peace Museum
 Jibakutai
 Kaoru Special Attack Corps
 List of Imperial Japanese Army air-to-surface special attack units
 List of Imperial Japanese Navy air-to-surface special attack units
 Piso Point
 Suicide attack

References

External links
Japanese suicide weapons

Military history of Japan during World War II
Imperial Japanese Army
Imperial Japanese Navy
Japan campaign